The 1979 NCAA Division II football season, part of college football in the United States organized by the National Collegiate Athletic Association at the Division II level, began in August 1979, and concluded with the NCAA Division II Football Championship in December 1979 at University Stadium in Albuquerque, NM. During the game's two-year stretch in New Mexico, it was referred to as the Zia Bowl. The Delaware Fightin' Blue Hens defeated the Youngstown State Penguins, 38–21, to win their first Division II national title.

Conference changes and new programs
 One program upgraded to Division I-AA while one other downgraded back to Division II.

Conference standings

Conference summaries

Postseason

The 1979 NCAA Division II Football Championship playoffs were the sixth single-elimination tournament to determine the national champion of men's NCAA Division II college football. The championship game was held at University Stadium in Albuquerque, NM for the first time. With the game being played in New Mexico for the next two years, it was deemed the Zia Bowl.

Playoff bracket

See also
1979 NCAA Division I-A football season
1979 NCAA Division I-AA football season
1979 NCAA Division III football season
1979 NAIA Division I football season
1979 NAIA Division II football season

References